Pammenes of Marathon was a leading Athenian statesman early in the reign of Augustus. He was a key figure in the introduction of the imperial cult at Athens, overseeing the construction of the Temple of Roman and Augustus on the Acropolis and serving as Athens' first priest of Roma and Augustus. He was one of the three leading figures in Athens in the Augustan period, alongside Antipater of Phlya and Eucles of Marathon.

Life
Pammenes belonged to a family that had become prominent on Athenian-controlled Delos in the second century BC and he belonged to two priestly clans, the Gephyraei and the Erysichthonidae. They were "deeply implicated in the restoration of Athenian religion in the late first century BC." His grandfather, also called Pammenes, was archon of Athens in 83/2 BC and his father, Zenon, was epimeletes (essentially governor) of Delos and archon in 54/3 BC. Zenon seems to have been a supporter of Mark Antony in the years leading up to the Battle of Actium. Pammenes' brother, Zenon, was archon in 13/12 BC. In their old age, the city of Athens honoured the two brothers together with a statue group.

In the 30s BC, Pammenes led an embassy from the Gephyraei to Delphi to get sanction for reforms. Shortly after this, he served as agoranomos (market manager) and he was honoured by the merchants with a statue, for his "excellence and justice" in this role (IG II2 3493). He was archon some time between 25/4 BC and 22/1 BC. 

He was involved in the establishment of the Imperial cult of Augustus at Athens. At some time between 27 BC and 18/7 BC, while serving as Hoplite General (the chief magistrate of Athens), Pammenes oversaw the construction of the Temple of Goddess Roman and Augustus, directly in front of the Parthenon, on the Acropolis. Its dedicatory inscription (IG II3 4 10) reports that he also became Priest of the Goddess Roma and of Augustus the Saviour on the Acropolis.

Pammenes continued his family's traditional links with Delos, where he served as Priest of Delian Apollo from around 15 BC until at least AD 6. He was also gymnasiarch on the island.

Descendants
Pammenes married Phila, daughter of Menneas of Phlya (archon of ca. 30 BC), and they had two sons: Zenon, who was priest of Delian Apollo in the reign of Tiberius, and Pammenes, who became one of the exegetes of the Eleusinian cult and was honoured with a number of statues at Eleusis.  They are the last members of the family to enjoy a prominent position in the Athenian polity, but there may have been further descendants, into the second century AD.

References

Bibliography

External links
 
Ancient Athenian generals
1st-century BC Athenians
Ancient Athenian priests
Roman-era Greek priests